Kezi (also Romanized as Kezī; also known as Kezeh) is a village in Zamkan Rural District, in the Central District of Salas-e Babajani County, Kermanshah Province, Iran. At the 2006 census, its population was 157, in 35 families.

References 

Populated places in Salas-e Babajani County